Salvelinus leucomaenis, the whitespotted char, is an East Asian trout in the genus Salvelinus, called iwana in Japanese and kundzha (кунджа) in Russian. Both landlocked and ocean-run forms occur.

Iwana is widely fished in Japan. Apart from Hokkaido in Japan, the species is found in northeast Korea and in Russia in Sakhalin, Kuril Islands and Kamchatka.

The kirikuchi char (Salvelinus leucomaenis japonicus or Salvelinus japonicus) is usually considered a subspecies of S. leucomaenis. Two other subspecies are also listed, S. l. imbrius and S. l. pluvius.

References
 

leucomaenis
Fish of Japan
Fish described in 1814